Gawp is a cosmological concept in Jeju Island shamanism referring to the divide between heaven and earth, humans and non-humans, and the living and the dead.

 In the Jeju creation myth, a gawp between heaven and earth is said to be created from the original mingled state of the universe. Later, the god Daebyeol-wang creates a gawp between humans and non-humans when he numbs the tongues of animals, plants, and rocks so that they can no longer speak, and physically separates the living from the dead.
 In the Buldo-maji, a series of rituals held for fertility gods, shamans create a gawp between Saengbul-halmang, the goddess of childbirth and patron of young children, and Gusamseung-halmang, the goddess of dead children who send illnesses to kill babies and bring them under her dominion.
 In the Durin-gut, a ritual held to cure mental illnesses, shamans endeavor to create a gawp between the human patient and the malevolent dokkaebi that has entered their body and is responsible for the insanity.

References

Citations

Works cited
 
 
 

Korean shamanism
Culture in Jeju Province
Jeju mythology